Kenny Washington may refer to:

 Kenny Washington (American football) (1918–1971), American football player
 Kenny Washington (basketball), American basketball player and coach
 Kenny Washington (musician) (born 1958), American jazz musician
 Kenneth Washington (born 1946), American actor